The 34th Venice Biennale, held in 1968, was an exhibition of international contemporary art, with 34 participating nations. It took place in Venice, Italy. Winners of the Golden Lions Awards (Grand Prizes) included British painter Bridget Riley, French sculptor Nicolas Schöffer, German etcher Horst Janssen, and Italian sculptors Gianni Colombo and Pino Pascali. The opening days of the Biennale were marred by hard encounters between students protesting and the local police, which resulted in some of the artists refusing to show their work in solidarity.

References

Bibliography

Further reading 

 
 
 
 
 
 
 
 
 
 
 
 
 
 
 
 
 
 
 
 
 
 
 
 
 

1968 in art
1968 in Italy
Venice Biennale exhibitions